The year 674 BC was a year of the pre-Julian Roman calendar. In the Roman Empire, it was known as year 80 Ab urbe condita . The denomination 674 BC for this year has been used since the early medieval period, when the Anno Domini calendar era became the prevalent method in Europe for naming years.

Events

By place

Egypt 

 The Assyrians invade Egypt, but are driven back.

Births

Deaths

References 

670s BC